Marcel Dassault (born Marcel Ferdinand Bloch; 23 January 1892 – 17 April 1986) was a French engineer and industrialist who spent his career in aircraft manufacturing.

Early life and education

Born on 23 January 1892 in Paris, he was the youngest of the four children of Adolphe Bloch, a doctor, and his wife Noémie Allatini. His parents were Jewish.

He was educated at Lycée Condorcet in Paris. After studies in electrical engineering, he graduated from the Breguet School and Supaéro. At the latter school, Bloch was classmates with a Russian student named Mikhail Gurevich, who would later be instrumental in the creation of the MiG aircraft series.

Career 
Bloch worked at the French Aeronautics Research Laboratory at Chalais-Meudon during World War I and invented a type of aircraft propeller subsequently used by the French army during the conflict. In 1916, with Henry Potez and Louis Coroller, he formed a company, the Société d'Études Aéronautiques, to produce the SEA series of fighters.

In 1928, Bloch founded the aircraft company Société des Avions Marcel Bloch, which produced its first aircraft in 1930. In 1935, Bloch and Henry Potez entered into an agreement to buy Société Aérienne Bordelaise (SAB). In 1936, the company was nationalized as the Société Nationale de Constructions Aéronautiques du Sud Ouest (SNCASO). Bloch agreed to become the delegated administrator of the Minister for Air.

During the occupation of France by Nazi Germany during World War II, France's aviation industry was virtually disbanded, other than the compulsory manufacturing, assembly, and servicing of German designs. In October 1940, Bloch refused to collaborate with the German occupiers at Bordeaux-Aéronautique and was imprisoned by the Vichy government.

In 1944, the Nazis deported Bloch to the Buchenwald concentration camp, as punishment for refusing to co-operate with their regime. He was tortured, beaten, and held in solitary confinement. In the meantime, his wife was interned near Paris. Bloch was detained at Buchenwald until it was liberated on 11 April 1945. By the time of his return to Paris, he was crippled to such an extent that he could barely walk. He was advised by his doctors to settle his affairs, as they did not expect him to recover his health. 

After the war, he changed his name from Bloch to Bloch-Dassault and in 1949 to Dassault. This name was the nom de guerre used by his brother, General Darius Paul Bloch, when he served in the French resistance, and is derived from char d'assault, French for "tank". In 1971, Dassault acquired Breguet, forming Avions Marcel Dassault–Breguet Aviation (AMD–BA).

Personal life 

In 1919, Bloch married Madeleine Minckes, the daughter of a wealthy Jewish family of furniture dealers. They had two sons, Claude and Serge. After changing his name to Dassault (nom de guerre from his brother General Paul Bloch was Chardasso and derived from char d’assaut for tank in French), he converted to the Roman Catholic Church in 1950.

In July 1952, Dassault acquired the Paris landmark buildings now known as Hôtel Marcel Dassault, dating from 1844,
at nos. 7 and 9 rond-point des Champs-Élysées (at the corner of the avenue des Champs-Élysées and avenue Montaigne), from the Sabatier d'Espeyran family. The building at no. 7 has been used since 2002 by the auction house Artcurial, which had further alterations made under the direction of architect Jean-Michel Wilmotte. While no. 7 has been sold, no. 9  is still used by the Groupe Industriel Marcel Dassault.

In 1973, Dassault was inducted into the International Air & Space Hall of Fame.

Death and legacy

Dassault died at Neuilly-sur-Seine in 1986 and was buried at the Passy Cemetery in the 16th arrondissement of Paris.

Serge Dassault, Marcel's younger son, became CEO of Avions Marcel Dassault, which was restructured as Groupe Industriel Marcel Dassault, reflecting its broader interests. In 1990, the aviation division was renamed Dassault Aviation.

In 1991, the rond-point des Champs-Elysées in Paris was renamed the rond-point des Champs-Elysées-Marcel-Dassault in his honor.

In popular culture
In The Adventures of Tintin book Flight 714 to Sydney, Dassault is parodied as the aircraft construction tycoon Laszlo Carreidas – "the millionaire who never laughs" – who offers Tintin, Captain Haddock and Professor Calculus his personal jet, the Carreidas 160, to travel to Sydney.

Notes

References

External links

 Marcel Dassault biography – Dassault Aviation website

 
1892 births
1986 deaths
Businesspeople from Paris
Politicians from Paris
Marcel
19th-century French Jews
French Roman Catholics
Converts to Roman Catholicism from Judaism
Rally of the French People politicians
National Centre of Social Republicans politicians
Union for the New Republic politicians
Union of Democrats for the Republic politicians
Rally for the Republic politicians
Deputies of the 2nd National Assembly of the French Fourth Republic
French Senators of the Fourth Republic
Senators of Oise
Deputies of the 1st National Assembly of the French Fifth Republic
Deputies of the 2nd National Assembly of the French Fifth Republic
Deputies of the 3rd National Assembly of the French Fifth Republic
Deputies of the 4th National Assembly of the French Fifth Republic
Deputies of the 5th National Assembly of the French Fifth Republic
Deputies of the 6th National Assembly of the French Fifth Republic
Deputies of the 7th National Assembly of the French Fifth Republic
Deputies of the 8th National Assembly of the French Fifth Republic
Grand Croix of the Légion d'honneur
French aerospace engineers
Businesspeople in aviation
French industrialists
20th-century French inventors
Lycée Condorcet alumni
Supaéro alumni
Buchenwald concentration camp survivors
Royal Aeronautical Society Gold Medal winners
Burials at Passy Cemetery